Atrotus is a genus of beetles in the family Carabidae, containing the following species:

 Atrotus aethiopicus Basilewsky, 1951 
 Atrotus bedeli (Alluaud, 1908) 
 Atrotus bicolor Britton, 1948
 Atrotus chenzemae Basilewsky, 1976 
 Atrotus dallastai Basilewsky, 1977 
 Atrotus elgonensis Basilewsky, 1954 
 Atrotus forcipatus Peringuey, 1896 
 Atrotus kivuensis (Burgeon, 1935) 
 Atrotus kundelunguensis Basilewsky, 1953 
 Atrotus lamottei Basilewsky, 1968 
 Atrotus leleupi Basilewsky, 1951 
 Atrotus luror Peringuey, 1926 
 Atrotus mandibularis Basilewsky, 1956 
 Atrotus oldeanicus Basilewsky, 1962 
 Atrotus scotti (Alluaud, 1937) 
 Atrotus sjoestedti (Alluaud, 1926) 
 Atrotus uluguruanus Basilewsky, 1962

References

Licininae